Carlos Ángel López Llanes (17 July 1952 – 30 September 2018) was an Argentine professional footballer who played as a midfielder.

Career
Born in Misiones Province, López played for River Plate, Argentinos Juniors, Estudiantes de La Plata, Racing Club, Vélez Sarsfield, Sarmiento, Millonarios, Boca Juniors, Atlético Junior and Club Bolívar.

He also scored 1 goal in 4 games for the Argentina national team.

Later life and death
He died on 30 September 2018 at the age of 66.

References

1952 births
2018 deaths
Argentine footballers
Argentina international footballers
Club Atlético River Plate footballers
Argentinos Juniors footballers
Estudiantes de La Plata footballers
Racing Club de Avellaneda footballers
Club Atlético Vélez Sarsfield footballers
Club Atlético Sarmiento footballers
Millonarios F.C. players
Boca Juniors footballers
Atlético Junior footballers
Club Bolívar players
Argentine Primera División players
Categoría Primera A players
Association football midfielders
Argentine expatriate footballers
Argentine expatriate sportspeople in Colombia
Expatriate footballers in Colombia
Argentine expatriate sportspeople in Bolivia
Expatriate footballers in Bolivia
People from Posadas, Misiones
Sportspeople from Misiones Province